The Stainless Barrier is a 1917 American silent drama film directed by Thomas N. Heffron and starring Irene Hunt, Jack Livingston and Henry A. Barrows.

Cast
 Irene Hunt as Betsy Shelton
 Jack Livingston as Calvin Stone
 Henry A. Barrows as Roger Enderleigh 
 Rowland V. Lee as Richard Shelton 
 Tom Guise as Thomas Crosby 
 J. Barney Sherry as Wilbur Gray
 John Lince as Wallace
 Kate Bruce as Aunt Ruth Shelton
 Lena Harris as Mammy
 Jim Farley as Williams

References

Bibliography
 Lowe, Denise. An Encyclopedic Dictionary of Women in Early American Films: 1895-1930. Routledge, 2014.

External links
 

1917 films
1917 drama films
1910s English-language films
American silent feature films
Silent American drama films
American black-and-white films
Triangle Film Corporation films
Films directed by Thomas N. Heffron
1910s American films